University Park is a census-designated place (CDP) in Doña Ana County, New Mexico, United States. The population was 4,192 at the 2010 census. It is part of the Las Cruces Metropolitan Statistical Area.

The CDP is almost all of the area bounded by University Avenue, Interstate 10 and Interstate 25 and is thus very nearly coextensive with the Las Cruces campus of New Mexico State University.

Geography
University Park is located at  (32.276861, -106.751408). It is surrounded by the city limits of Las Cruces, with the city center located to the north.

Demographics

As of the census of 2000, there were 2,732 people, 417 households, and 351 families residing in the CDP. The population density was 1,741.2 people per square mile (671.9/km). There were 615 housing units at an average density of 392.0 per square mile (151.2/km). The racial makeup of the CDP was 66.69% White, 4.98% African American, 5.60% Native American, 5.67% Asian, 0.18% Pacific Islander, 12.48% from other races, and 4.39% from two or more races. Hispanic or Latino of any race were 37.15% of the population.

There were 417 households, out of which 64.3% had children under the age of 18 living with them, 56.8% were married couples living together, 24.0% had a female householder with no husband present, and 15.8% were non-families. 12.9% of all households were made up of individuals, and none had someone living alone who was 65 years of age or older. The average household size was 2.82 and the average family size was 3.08.

In the CDP, the population was spread out, with 16.5% under the age of 18, 63.2% from 18 to 24, 17.9% from 25 to 44, 2.3% from 45 to 64, and 0.1% who were 65 years of age or older. The median age was 20 years. For every 100 females, there were 89.6 males. For every 100 females age 18 and over, there were 86.3 males.

The median income for a household in the CDP was $13,045, and the median income for a family was $13,365. Males had a median income of $16,500 versus $18,750 for females. The per capita income for the CDP was $4,152. About 56.4% of families and 53.1% of the population were below the poverty line, including 56.5% of those under age 18 and 100.0% of those age 65 or over.

In 2010, University Park had the fourth-lowest median household income of all places in the United States with a population over 1,000.

Education
It is located in Las Cruces Public Schools.

References

Census-designated places in Doña Ana County, New Mexico
Census-designated places in New Mexico